Green October Event 2015 was the 1st edition of Green October Event held on 1 October 2015 at Peninsula Hotel, Lekki, Lagos, Nigeria.

Tarmar Awobotu and Emmanuel Ikubese hosted the first edition of the event. It was focused on children living with down syndrome in Nigeria.

Fashion designers that showcased their designs were O'Saunders, Agatha Moreno, Cal Ogbah Clothing, Sassy Fashion House, Fabulousadivastiche, Neri Couture, S2 Dynamics, Adunni-Oge Couture and VickyHeldan.

Award recipients
The first edition of Green October Event was held on 1 October 2015 at Peninsula Hotel, Lekki, Lagos, Nigeria.

Humanitarian awards
Tony Elumelu
Osasu Igbinedion
Omotola Jalade Ekeinde
Ruth Evon Idahosa
2Baba
Rose Mordi
Osas Ajibade
Ezinne Akudo
Ariyike Akinbobola
Runcie C.W Chidebe

Recognition awards
FashionJunlie9ja
LASSA
Alex Reports
Four23 Photograhy
VickyHeldan
Snazzy Label
Karo Ekewenu
CandyCity Entertainment

References

Nigerian awards
Business and industry awards
Awards for contributions to society
Humanitarian and service awards